Huo Siyan (born October 23, 1981) is a Chinese actress.

Biography
Huo was born in a middle-class family in Beijing. Both her parents were university dons. She made her debut in an advertisement during 11th grade in school, and entered showbiz as she was invited to participate in a selection test for acting in a television series. After taking the college entrance examination, Huo chose to become a professional actress and started working on some television series. Her film debut was My Name Is Fame, in which she co-starred with Hong Kong actor Sean Lau.

Filmography

Film

Television series

Awards and nominations

References

External links

  Huo Siyan's page on Sina.com
  Huo Siyan's blog on Sina.com
 Actress Huo Siyan to Attend BIFF at The China Times

1981 births
Living people
Chinese television actresses
Chinese film actresses
21st-century Chinese actresses
20th-century Chinese actresses
Actresses from Beijing